
Year 248 (CCXLVIII) was a leap year starting on Saturday (link will display the full calendar) of the Julian calendar. At the time, it was known as the Year of the Consulship of Philippus and Severus (or, less frequently, year 1001 Ab urbe condita). The denomination 248 for this year has been used since the early medieval period, when the Anno Domini calendar era became the prevalent method in Europe for naming years.

Events 
 By place 
 Roman Empire 
 The revolts of Pacatianus in Moesia and Iotapianus in Syria are put down by Senator Trajan Decius, by order of Emperor Philip the Arab.
 The Roman Empire continues the celebration of the 1,000th anniversary of Rome, with the ludi saeculares, organized by Philip the Arab.

 Asia 
 Jungcheon becomes ruler of the Korean kingdom of Goguryeo (until 270).

 By topic 
 Religion 
 Cyprian, Christian writer of Berber descent, becomes bishop of Carthage.
 Origen writes an eight-volume work, criticizing the pagan writer Celsus.

Births 
 Flavia Iulia Helena, Roman empress (approximate date)
 Li Liu (or Xuantong), Chinese Grand General (d. 303)
 Sima You (or Dayou), Chinese prince and politician (d. 283)

Deaths 
 Dongcheon, Korean ruler of Goguryeo (b. 209)
 Himiko (or Shingi Waō), Japanese queen (b. 170)
 Trieu Thi Trinh, Vietnamese female warrior (b. 226)
 Wang Ping, Chinese general and politician

References